The Dunbar Theatre is a movie theater in Wichita, Kansas, United States. Opened in 1941, it was named after an American author Paul Laurence Dunbar.  It is listed in the National Register of Historic Places  since July 2, 2008, and the Kansas State Registry of Historic Places. It is located at 1007 N Cleveland St. in the McAdams Neighborhood,  which is a historically African-American Neighborhood.

History

Origin 
The Dunbar Theatre opened on August 15, 1941, a time at which  other theaters in the Wichita area did not serve African American patrons. It was designed by Raymond M. Harmon, and built specifically to serve the African American community.

Significance 
The Dunbar was the hub of the neighborhood business and social community. The area was one of only a few where African Americans could freely do business and participate in cultural and social events in the Jim Crow era. In addition to films, the Dunbar hosted plays, pageants, and touring African American performers.

Wichitan Ferwilda Sears said, "The blacks didn't have a theater to go to, but the Dunbar was open to us."  City Councilwoman Lavonta Williams, who represents the area said, “When we were kids, we were dropped off at that theater almost every Saturday.”

Decline 
The Dunbar closed in 1963. The City of Wichita twice attempted to condemn and demolish the Dunbar in 1980 and 1991, 'but the historic site was saved through community action.

Restoration 
Restoration of the Dunbar is a project of the P.O.W.E.R. Community Development Corporation led by James Arbertha, Founding Executive Director, who hopes to reopen the Dunbar in 2020.  Restoration of the sign and marquee took place from 2012-2014. The new Marquee was dedicated on  December 14, 2012.
The Wichita City Council approved funding more than $600,000 toward the renovation effort in November 2017. Once restored, the Dunbar will be a 340-seat theater with a concession area and restrooms.

After the existing theatre is restored, new construction will begin to add a black box theater, an arts center, educational facilities, a public gallery, and a bookstore. The restoration effort will also include the Turner Drug Store, which will be converted to a cafe.

Current use 
Despite the theater not being ready for use, outdoor community activities take place on the property outside. Two of the more notable events were the August 25, 2017 End of Summer Bash, and the September 3, 2018 Melanin Fest, both fundraisers for the restoration efforts.

References 

1941 establishments in Kansas
National Register of Historic Places in Wichita, Kansas
Cinemas and movie theaters in Kansas
African-American history of Kansas
Wichita, Kansas
Community development
Community centres
Culture of Wichita, Kansas
History of Wichita, Kansas
Non-profit organizations based in the United States
African-American cinema